Removal is a Canadian progressive metal/experimental music group based in  Vancouver. They recorded and released six studio albums. The band produced and released instrumental only music on their full-length albums, occasionally partnering with other artists to provide lyrics and vocals for an existing musical track. The band performs without vocal microphones, communicating with the audience through text and images projected on the wall behind the band.

History 
Removal was formed in 1997 in Vancouver. Guitarist Bill Johnston and bassist Rob Clark met drummer Ernie Hawkins when they began recording some of their jam sessions at his studio, Big Midget.

The band completed a number of tours in Europe, and for a time kept a van of tour equipment at the ready in Amsterdam for their roughly annual tours, including one in 2004 in support of their album The Strong Silent Type.  Removal used the 1980 Ford Econoline van that accompanied Terry Fox on the Marathon of Hope for touring in North America for many years.

The band released its last album in 2007.

Discography

References

External links 
 Removal at Myspace
 Removal at CBC Radio 3
 BBC Mint Tracklisting
 Instrumental Prog Metal Punks at redcat.ca
 Hard Rock in Rainy November
 Kulturwerk

Musical groups established in 1997
Musical groups from Vancouver
Canadian experimental musical groups
1997 establishments in British Columbia